= TOP Bud =

TOP Bud is the first TV reality television show set in a Los Angeles, California medicinal marijuana collective. TOP Bud is created and produced by Blue Dream Media, a Los Angeles entertainment company and shopped by Original Media, an Endemol USA company. CNBC Business News reported that interest in the subject matter has "Blown up."

The show was described to The New York Times as "a cross between “LA Ink,” the TLC show produced by Original about a lively tattoo parlor, and “Weeds,”Weeds (TV series) the Showtime hit drama about a dope-dealing mother of two.".
