= Blue Dream Media =

Former American television production company

Blue Dream Media was an entertainment development and production company located in Los Angeles, California known primarily for producing the reality television show TOP Bud. The company gained additional notoriety following a New York Times and CNBC profile on their show and the genre of Pot TV.
